House of Hazelwood is a brand of aged Scotch whisky, owned and produced by the Gordon family, owners of William Grant & Sons. The whisky is made with spirit from the Gordon family's private collection.

House of Hazelwood was launched in May 2022 and currently has two collections, one of which is dedicated to Charles Gordon who was responsible for the construction of Girvan Grain Distillery. The whiskies within the collection typically range from 35-60 years old and are priced between £950-£4,900 per bottle.

The brand's name is taken from that of the Gordon family's historic home, Hazelwood House, the dower house of Kininvie Castle.

Variants 
At present, there are sixteen blended and grain expressions sold under the House of Hazelwood brand:

The Charles Gordon Collection

 A Singular Blend - 1963 Blended Scotch Whisky. 
 The Next Chapter - 50 Year Old Blended Scotch 
 The Unknown - 44 Year Old Blended Scotch 
 The Old Confectioner's - 44 Year Old Blended Malt 
 The First Drop - 1964 Single Grain Scotch Whisky 
 Blended at Birth - 1965 Blended Scotch Whisky 
 The Cask Trials - 1986 Sherry Cask Single Grain Scotch Whisky 
 The Long Marriage - 56 Year Old Double Matured Blended Scotch Whisky 

The Legacy Collection 

 A Breath of Fresh Air - 37 Year Old Blended Grain Scotch Whisky 
 The Eight Grain - 40 Year Old Blended Grain Scotch Whisky 
 The Lowlander - 36 Year Old Blended Scotch Whisky 
 A Trail of Smoke - 42 Year Old Blended Malt Scotch Whisky 
 The Spirit of Scotland - 46 Year Old Double Matured Blended Scotch Whisky 
 Sunshine on Speyside - 39 Year Old Blended Malt Scotch Whisky 
 The Tops - 33 Year Old Speyside Blended Malt Scotch Whisky 
 The Lost Estate - 43 Year Old Blended Grain Scotch Whisky

References 

Blended Scotch whisky
William Grant & Sons